The 1977 All-Ireland Senior Hurling Championship Final was the 90th All-Ireland Final and the culmination of the 1977 All-Ireland Senior Hurling Championship, an inter-county hurling tournament for the top teams in Ireland. The match was held at Croke Park, Dublin, on 4 September 1977, between Cork and Wexford. The Leinster champions lost to their Munster opponents for a second consecutive year on a score line of 1-17 to 3-8.

Match details

All-Ireland Senior Hurling Championship Final
All-Ireland Senior Hurling Championship Final, 1977
All-Ireland Senior Hurling Championship Final
All-Ireland Senior Hurling Championship Finals
Cork county hurling team matches
Wexford GAA matches